The Sunshine of Your Youth is the debut album by American indie pop band Cheerleader, released in 2015 by Bright Antenna Records. The album release was supported by a nationwide tour with UK act The Wombats.

Critical reception
Spin wrote that the album "showcases a series of fizzy, blurry-eyed tracks: 'A Million Ways' combines dream-rock guitar riffs with sugary-sweet melodies, while the whimsically synthy 'Dreamer' glides into shoegaze territory with frontman Joe Haller’s lo-fi vocals at the forefront." The Saratogian wrote that "the band stays true to their sunny, optimistic name throughout, delivering a record full of hope, wonder, and undeniable warmth."

Track listing

New Daze - 3:31
The Sunshine of Your Youth - 3:28
On Your Side - 4:06
Do What You Want - 3:55
Perfect Vision - 4:12
Haunted Love - 3:50
A Million Ways - 4:04
Dreamer - 3:12
The Quiet Life - 3:48
Little Bird - 3:23

Personnel
Produced and mixed by Mark Needham
Assistant Engineer: Will Brierre
Mastered by Emily Lazar at The Lodge in NYC, assisted by Rich Morales
Additional vocals on "On Your Side," "Perfect Vision," and "Dreamer" courtesy of Christa Tubach
Art Direction & Design: Ryan Penn
Band Photo: Carrie Davenport

References

External links
Official Site
Band's Official Facebook
Band's Official Twitter

2015 debut albums
Albums recorded at EastWest Studios